The 1937 Rhode Island Rams football team was an American football team that represented Rhode Island State College (later renamed the University of Rhode Island) as a member of the New England Conference during the 1937 college football season. In its 18th season under head coach Frank Keaney, the team compiled a 3–4–1 record (0–2–1 against conference opponents) and finished in last place in the conference.

Schedule

References

Rhode Island State
Rhode Island Rams football seasons
Rhode Island State Rams football